The 1897 Virginia gubernatorial election was held on November 2, 1897 to elect the governor of Virginia.

Results

References

1897
Virginia
gubernatorial
November 1897 events